Neotenes is a genus of moths belonging to the family Tortricidae.

Species
Neotenes astromontana Diakonoff, 1972
Neotenes canescens (Diakonoff, 1954)

See also
List of Tortricidae genera

References

External links
tortricidae.com

Tortricidae genera